Echinothrix is a genus of sea urchins which was first described in 1853 by Wilhelm Peters, a German naturalist and explorer.

Description and characteristics 
The genus contains two species, E. diadema and E. calamaris. These can be distinguished by the fact that E. diadema has fully black spines whereas E. calamaris has striped spines. Both of these species are found in the Indo-Pacific region, living on coral reefs.

Taxonomy 
According to World Register of Marine Species :

References

Diadematidae
Taxa named by Wilhelm Peters